Rusland is a village in the South Lakeland district of Cumbria, England. It is located just to the southwest of Crosslands in the civil parish of Colton.

The writer Arthur Ransome is buried in the churchyard of the parish church.

See also

Listed buildings in Colton, Cumbria

References

External links
 Cumbria County History Trust: Colton (nb: provisional research only – see Talk page)

Villages in Cumbria
Colton, Cumbria